Bicycle poverty reduction is the concept that access to bicycles and the transportation infrastructure to support them can dramatically reduce poverty. This has been demonstrated in various pilot projects in South Asia and Africa. Experiments done in Africa (Uganda and Tanzania) and Sri Lanka on hundreds of households have shown that a bicycle can increase the income of a poor family by as much as 35%. 

Transport, if analyzed for the cost–benefit analysis for rural poverty alleviation, has given one of the best returns in this regard. For example, road investments in India were a staggering 3–10 times more effective than almost all other investments and subsidies in rural economy in the decade of the 1990s. A road can ease transport on a macro level, while bicycle access supports it at the micro level. In that sense, the bicycle can be one of the most effective means to eradicate poverty in poor nations.

Gallery

See also 
 Accessibility (transport)
 Baisikeli Ugunduzi
 Bikes Not Bombs
 Bikes to Rwanda
 BikeTown Africa
 Chukudu
 Pedaling to Freedom
 Transport divide
 With My Own Two Wheels
 World Bicycle Relief

References

Further reading 
Qhubeka: changing lives through bicycles
Cycling out of Poverty: a bike delivers on the global goals

External links 
One Bicycle Foundation

Bicycles
Cycling
Poverty activism